Destiny is a 1944 American drama film noir directed by Reginald Le Borg and starring Gloria Jean, Grace McDonald, Alan Curtis and Frank Craven.

Plot
A fugitive from the law (Curtis) leaps from a bridge, then gets a ride from a meek librarian (McDonald). After explaining how he became the victim of several double-crosses, he eventually finds  refuge with a blind girl (Jean) and her father (Craven) at a secluded farmhouse.

Cast
 Gloria Jean as Jane Broderick
 Alan Curtis as Cliff Banks
 Frank Craven as Clem Broderick
 Grace McDonald as Betty
 Vivian Austin as Phyllis Prager
 Frank Fenton as Sam Baker
 Minna Gombell as Marie

Background
Destiny was originally planned as the opening segment of the 1942 anthology episode drama Flesh and Fantasy directed by Julien Duvivier. However, after some previews Universal Pictures  decided to remove the opening segment despite the audience's enthusiasm. Not wanting to waste the footage, the studio hired screenwriter Roy Chanslor to come up with additional material and Reginald LeBorg to direct a few new scenes, so that the episode could be released as a separate feature film. Duvivier's original episode was supposed to have ended tragically, but Universal insisted upon a few "framing" scenes wherein the refugee is shown to be innocent of the crimes for which he has been imprisoned, and which allowed a happy ending. Because the new footage had not only a different director but also a different cinematographer and art director, sharp-eyed viewers can easily tell the new scenes (which have the "flat" look of most of that era's Universal crime thrillers) from the Duvivier sequence, which is much more atmospheric and shadow-laden.

Reception

Critical response
TV Guide'''s summary discussed the film's background, "It is surprising to realize when seen today that Destiny, with its fairy tale-like blending of beauty, mysticism, and horror, had few champions in its day. Nor did Gloria Jean--then a teenage soprano and deemed to be a threat to Universal's reigning songstress, Deanna Durbin--whose career soon after went into a steep decline. Oddly cast in Destiny'' was McDonald, the studio's top tap dancer, who not only did not dance in the film but did not even walk, playing her entire role behind the wheel of a car."

See also
List of American films of 1944

References

External links
 
 
 
 

1944 drama films
1944 films
American drama films
American black-and-white films
Film noir
Universal Pictures films
Films about blind people
Films scored by Frank Skinner
Films directed by Reginald Le Borg
1940s English-language films
1940s American films